The Jacob C. Allen House is a historic building at 206 West Moore Street in Hackettstown, Warren County, New Jersey. It was built  with a Second Empire architectural style. The house was added to the National Register of Historic Places for its significance in architecture on August 24, 2005.

References

External links
 

Hackettstown, New Jersey
National Register of Historic Places in Warren County, New Jersey
Houses on the National Register of Historic Places in New Jersey
New Jersey Register of Historic Places
Houses completed in 1870
Second Empire architecture in New Jersey
Houses in Warren County, New Jersey